In mathematics, the little q-Jacobi polynomials  pn(x;a,b;q) are a family of basic hypergeometric orthogonal polynomials in the basic Askey scheme, introduced by .  give a detailed list of their properties.

Definition

The  little q-Jacobi polynomials are given in terms of basic hypergeometric functions by

Gallery
The following are a set of animation plots for  Little q-Jacobi polynomials, with varying  q;
three  density plots of  imaginary, real and modulus in complex space; three set of complex 3D plots
of  imaginary, real and modulus of the said polynomials.

References

Orthogonal polynomials
Q-analogs
Special hypergeometric functions